Steven Kirby Taylor (born 28 November 1963) is a former English cricketer. Taylor was a right-handed batsman. He was born in York, Yorkshire.

Taylor made his debut for Norfolk in the 1991 Minor Counties Championship against Lincolnshire. Taylor played 3 further Minor Counties Championship matches in 1991. The following season he made his only List A appearance against Leicestershire in the NatWest Trophy. In this match, he was dismissed for a duck by David Millns. He made no further appearances for Norfolk following this match.

References

External links
Steven Taylor at ESPNcricinfo

1963 births
Living people
Cricketers from York
English cricketers
Norfolk cricketers
English cricketers of 1969 to 2000